Niamey, colloquially also known as Niamey Hippodrome, is the main railway station of the city of Niamey, the capital of Niger. Located near the Niamey Racecourse (Hippodrome de Niamey), in Niamey IV borough, is the first station opened in Niger and is part of AfricaRail project.

History
The station was officially inaugurated on 7 April 2014, with a ceremony and the arrival of the first train. The ceremony was attended by the Nigerien president Mahamadou Issoufou, along with the presidents of Benin, Thomas Boni Yayi, and Togo, Faure Gnassingbé; and Vincent Bolloré, chairman of the French group Bolloré. The group set up the structures for the reception of invited guests, and a section of 500 m of track for the circulation of the inaugural train, consisting of a diesel locomotive and some passenger cars. In the same day, it was also inaugurated, by the station, the "Bluezone Niamey".

January 29, 2016 the train line Niamey-Dosso of 143 km was inaugurated, but no trains have used the track since March 2017.

Services and projects
Currently, in 2015, there are no regular services but only tests on a track of 34 km, and educational visits. Once ended the station expansion and the line construction, with the junction at the existing station of Parakou, in Benin, Niamey station will be the northern terminus of an international line to Cotonou, the largest Beninese city.

Another future project would provide the construction of a line from Ouagadougou, the Burkinabé capital, that will link Niamey to Abidjan, in Ivory Coast.

See also
Rail transport in Niger
Railway stations in Niger
Rail transport in Benin
Railway stations in Benin

References

External links

Niamey
Railway station
Railway station
Railway stations opened in 2014
2014 establishments in Niger